is a railway station in the city of Shiogama, Miyagi Prefecture, Japan, operated by the East Japan Railway Company (JR East).

Lines
Hon-Shiogama Station is served by the Senseki Line. It is located 16.0 rail kilometers from the terminus of the Senseki Line at Aoba-dōri Station.

Station layout
Hon-Shiogama Station has two elevated opposed side platforms with the station building located underneath. The station has a Midori no Madoguchi staffed ticket office.

Platforms

History
Hon-Shiogama Station opened on April 14, 1926 as a station on the Miyagi Electric Railway. The line was nationalized on May 1, 1944. On November 1, 1981 the station was relocated to its present location and rebuilt as an elevated station. The station was absorbed into the JR East network upon the privatization of JNR on April 1, 1987.

Passenger statistics
In fiscal 2016, the station was used by an average of 2,992 passengers daily (boarding passengers only).

Surrounding area
Shiogama City Hall
Royal Home Center
Highway 45
Mae-Hon-Shiogama Post Office
Shiogama Shrine
Shiogama Port

See also
 List of Railway Stations in Japan

References

External links

  

Railway stations in Miyagi Prefecture
Senseki Line
Railway stations in Japan opened in 1926
Stations of East Japan Railway Company
Shiogama, Miyagi